Odisha is an Indian state in Eastern India.

Odisha may also refer to:

Sports
 Odisha cricket team, a cricket team in Odisha, India
 Odisha women's cricket team, a women's cricket team in Odisha, India
 Hockey Odisha (Odisha Hockey Team), a field hockey team in Odisha, India
 Odisha rugby union team, a men's rugby team in Odisha, India
 Odisha women's rugby union team, a women's rugby team in Odisha, India
 Odisha football team, a men's football team in Odisha, India
 Odisha women's football team, a women's football team in Odisha, India
 Odisha FC, a football team in Bhubaneswar, Odisha, India
 Odisha Open, an annual badminton tournament in Odisha, India

Companies, groups, organizations
 Odisha TV, an Odia Indian cable television station
 Air Odisha, a regional airline of India operating from Odisha

Other uses
 Odisha (genus), a genus of flowering plant
 Odisha Day, a public holiday in Odisha, India

See also

 Outline of Odisha (Odisha, India)
 Central University of Odisha (Odisha, India)
 Odisha University of Technology and Research (Odisha, India)
 Odisha University of Agriculture and Technology (Odisha, India)
 Odisha Adarsha Vidyalaya, a chain of schools in Odisha, India
 Odisha State Film Awards, Odisha, India
 
 Orissa (disambiguation)
 Odesa (disambiguation) 
 Odessa (disambiguation)
 Edessa (disambiguation)